The Incongruous Spy: Two Novels of Suspense (1964), by John le Carré, is an omnibus edition of le Carré's first two novels Call for the Dead (1961) and A Murder of Quality (1962). The omnibus, about George Smiley, was released after his third novel, The Spy Who Came in from the Cold (1963).

See also
 Smiley Versus Karla

References

Novels by John le Carré
1964 British novels
British spy novels